Balachandra Laxmanrao Jarkiholi (b 1966) is an Indian politician who is the current MLA from Arabhavi, Belgaum district and chairman of Karnataka Milk Federation. He and his 4 brothers are all very active in local politics.

Political career
He was elected to the Karnataka Legislative Assembly  from Arabhavi constituency in Belgaum district in 2004 and 2008 on a Janata Dal (Secular) ticket. In 2013 and 2018 he fought the election on a Bharatiya Janata Party ticket and won again from Arabhavi.

Ministry
He was a Minister in the H.D. Kumaraswamy led 2004 and 2008 Government.

References

External links 
 Karnataka Legislative Assembly

Living people
Bharatiya Janata Party politicians from Karnataka
Karnataka MLAs 2004–2007
Karnataka MLAs 2008–2013
Karnataka MLAs 2013–2018
Karnataka MLAs 2018–2023
1966 births
Janata Dal (Secular) politicians